Outdoor dining, also known as al fresco dining or dining alfresco, is eating outside.

In temperate climates, al fresco dining is especially popular in the summer months when temperatures and weather are most favorable. It is a style of dining that is casual and often party-like in its atmosphere.

In order to promote and accommodate the pedestrian activity and vibrancy associated with al fresco dining, some communities have passed ordinances permitting it at restaurants, including the service of food and alcoholic beverages to customers at pavement tables, until late at night.

Etymology 
The phrase al fresco composed of two words, is borrowed from Italian for "in the cool/fresh [air]". It is not in current use in Italian to refer to dining outside. Instead, Italians use the phrases fuori ("outside", "outdoor") or all'aperto ("in the open [air]"). In Italian, the expression al fresco usually refers to spending time in jail.

COVID-19 pandemic 

In 2020, responding to the COVID-19 pandemic, cities increased the options for restaurants to offer outdoor dining, in order to promote open space, encourage social distancing, and help businesses economically recover from the pandemic's impact. In New York City, 10,600 restaurants had enrolled in the city's outdoor dining program by September 2020, compared to just 1,023 sidewalk cafes that existed before the pandemic. The use of bubble tents or outdoor dining pods also increased during the pandemic. Before the pandemic these pod installations were very rare. Although these pods offer better protection against the virus, they have been criticized for their lack of air ventilation.

See also 
 Sidewalk cafe
Outstanding in the Field

References 

Serving and dining